HNA may refer to:

Companies and organizations
 HNA Group, a Chinese conglomerate
 Hainan Airlines, a Chinese airline
 Hafslund (company), a Norwegian power company
 Harry N. Abrams, Inc., now Abrams Books, an American publisher
 High North Alliance, an organization of fishing, whaling, and Nordic municipal councils
 Hilti North America, a building support and maintenance company

Transportation
 Hanamaki Airport, serving Iwate Prefecture, Japan (IATA code HNA)
 Hawks Nest Airport, airport near Hawk's Nest Creek, The Bahamas
 Hinton Admiral railway station, in Hampshire, England

Other
 Hereditary neuralgic amyotrophy
 Hexose nucleic acid, synthesized by xenobiology researchers
 Heeresnachrichtenamt, the Austrian Army Intelligence Office
 Heslar Naval Armory, constructed in 1936 in Indianapolis, Indiana
 Hessische/Niedersächsische Allgemeine, a German regional newspaper
 Hina language, a Chadic language spoken in Northern Cameroon
 Holy Names Academy, in Seattle, Washington
 Hoosier Nationals ABA, race that is a part of the American Bicycle Association racing schedule
Human Neutrophil Antigen
 Wright etch and other etching techniques that use Hydrofluoric, Nitric and Acetic acid (HNA)